Horodnia Raion was a raion (district) of Chernihiv Oblast, northern Ukraine. Its administrative centre was located at the town of Horodnia. The raion was abolished on 18 July 2020 as part of the administrative reform of Ukraine, which reduced the number of raions of Chernihiv Oblast to five. The area of Horodnia Raion was merged into Chernihiv Raion. The last estimate of the raion population was 

At the time of disestablishment, the raion consisted of two hromadas:
 Horodnia urban hromada with the administration in Horodnia;
 Tupychiv rural hromada with the administration in the selo of Tupychiv.

References

Former raions of Chernihiv Oblast
1965 establishments in Ukraine
Ukrainian raions abolished during the 2020 administrative reform